In law, a prerogative is an exclusive right bestowed by a government or state and invested in an individual or group, the content of which is separate from the body of rights enjoyed under the general law. It was a common facet of feudal law. The word is derived from Old French prerogative (14c.), M.L. prerogativa "special  right", from Latin praerogativa "prerogative, previous choice or election", originally (with tribus, centuria) "100 voters who by lot voted first in the Roman comitia", from praerogativus (adj.) "chosen to vote first."

Topics
 Extraterritoriality
 Prerogative court 
 Prerogative writ
 Royal prerogative

See also

Individual rights
Sui juris
 "My Prerogative" (song)

References

Legal terminology
Rights